Herzblut is an EP by German female hard rock singer Doro Pesch, released in 2009 through AFM Records. The EP contains five version of the power ballad "Herzblut", also sung in French, Spanish and Portuguese. The EP was issued a few weeks before the album Fear No Evil in 2009.

The EP reached position No. 71 in the German singles chart.

Track listing
"Herzblut" (single version) (Doro Pesch, Andreas Bruhn) – 3:43
"Herzblut" (album version) – 4:39
"A Fond Le Coeur" (Herzblut French version) – 3:59
"Te Doy Mi Corazón" (Herzblut Spanish version) – 4:39
"Eu Dou-Te O Meu Coração" (Herzblut Portuguese version) – 4:07
"Share My Fate" (Pesch, Torsten Sickert) – 3:05

Personnel

Band members
Doro Pesch – vocals, producer
Nick Douglas – bass
Joe Taylor – guitars
Johnny Dee – drums
Oliver Palotai – keyboards, guitars
Luca Princiotta – keyboards, guitars

Additional musicians
Andreas Bruhn – guitars, bass, producer, engineer, mixing
Chris Lietz – guitar, keyboards, engineer, mixing
Torsten Sickert – keyboards, guitars, bass, programming, engineer, mixing

References

Doro (musician) EPs
2008 EPs
AFM Records EPs